Thermus Butler (born March 20, 1947) is an American-born Canadian football player who played for the Edmonton Eskimos.He previously played football at the University of Kansas.

Education 
High School: George Washington Carver (Columbus, GA)

College: Kansas [1965fr 1966L 1967L]

References 

Living people
1947 births
Edmonton Elks players